Alicia Ortuño and Cristina Torrens Valero were the defending champions, but competed this year with different partners.

Ortuño teamed up with Seda Noorlander and lost in quarterfinals to Kristie Boogert and Anne-Gaëlle Sidot.

Torrens Valero teamed up with Amanda Hopmans and lost in the final 6–0, 7–6(11–9) to tournament winners Tina Križan and Katarina Srebotnik.

Seeds

Draw

Draw

References
 Main and Qualifying Draws (WTA)

Portugal Open
2000 WTA Tour
Estoril Open